Bunyambo, commonly known as Bunyanbo, is an administrative ward in Muhambwe Constituency in Kibondo District of Kigoma Region in Tanzania. In 2016 the Tanzania National Bureau of Statistics report there were 14,929 people in the ward, from 13,563 in 2012.

Villages / neighborhoods 
The ward has 3 villages and 31 hamlets.

 Minyinya
 Bavunja A
 Bavunja B
 Bustani
 Minyinya
 Mlima Ndeneze
 Mugoboka
 Nyamsoma A
 Nyamsoma B
 Uwanja Ndege A
 Uwanja Ndege B
 Bunyambo 
 Bunyambo
 Makingi A
 Makingi B
 Mjigojigo
 Mrombo
 Mtaho A
 Mtaho B
 Nakibhondo
 Ntautunze
 Nyangwa
 Samvura 
 Buyezi
 Mguruka
 Nakibhondo
 Nyamatore
 Nyamigina
 Nyangwa A
 Nyangwa B
 Nyarubogo A
 Rutenge
 Samvura
 Senjogo

References

Kibondo District
Constituencies of Tanzania